Joseph Anthony White (born 18 January 2002) is a footballer who plays for Marine.

Career
He made his debut for Bolton Wanderers on the opening day of the 19/20 season, coming on as a 14th minute substitute for Josh Earl. After being released by Bolton at the end of the season he signed for Lower Breck for the 20/21 season and scored twice on his debut on 3 October against Ashton Town. On 17 October he also joined F.C. United of Manchester through dual registration. He played twice. He signed for Ashton Athletic for the 2021–22 season. He also once again played for F.C. United of Manchester via dual registration. In January 2022, he signed for Marine.

Career statistics

Notes

References

Living people
2002 births
English footballers
Association football defenders
Bolton Wanderers F.C. players
English Football League players
Footballers from Liverpool
Lower Breck F.C. players
F.C. United of Manchester players
Ashton Athletic F.C. players
North West Counties Football League players
Marine F.C. players